Aldborough is a village  to the north-east of Knaresborough, in the civil parish of Boroughbridge in the Borough of Harrogate in North Yorkshire, England.

Historically a part of the West Riding of Yorkshire, Aldborough was built on the site of a major Romano-British town, Isurium Brigantum. The Brigantes, the most populous Celtic tribe in the area at the time of the Roman occupation of Britain, used the settlement as a capital. Isurium may also have been the base of the Roman Legio VIIII Hispana.

Archaeology

Aldborough was built on the site of a major Roman town, Isurium Brigantum, which marked the crossing of Dere Street, the Roman Road from York north to the Antonine Wall via Corbridge and Hadrian's Wall. Isurium Brigantum, after AD160, was the administrative centre of the Brigantes (and around about the centre of two ridings and York's land that the Brigantes originally covered), the most populous British tribe in the area at the time of the Roman occupation. Traces of comfortable houses have been found, with many potsherds, coins and bronze, iron and other objects, and a large part of the town walls can be seen. The Aldborough Roman Site museum, run by English Heritage, contains relics of the Roman town, including mosaic pavements.

Currently an extensive project is in progress directed by Rose Ferraby and Martin Millett, which has undertaken extensive geophysical surveys, not only of the town and also the suburbs. These have revealed the regular layout of the town, showing the presence of a military compound and confirming the position of the forum and amphitheatre.

History

Aldborough was mentioned in the Domesday Book of 1086 as Burgh (Old English burh 'ancient fortification').  By 1145 the prefix ald (old) had been added.

Aldborough lost much of its importance when the river crossing was moved to Boroughbridge in Norman times. In the Middle Ages it was made a Parliamentary Borough, and returned two Members of Parliament (MPs) until the seat was abolished in the Great Reform Act of 1832.

Aldborough was a large ancient parish, which included townships in both the West Riding of Yorkshire and across the River Ure in the North Riding.  In the West Riding the parish included Aldborough, Boroughbridge, Lower Dunsforth, Minskip, Roecliffe and Upper Dunsforth.  In the North Riding the parish included Ellenthorpe and Milby.  All these places became separate civil parishes in 1866.

In 1938 the civil parish of Aldborough was abolished and merged into the civil parish of Boroughbridge.  In 1974 Aldborough was transferred from the West Riding to the new county of North Yorkshire.

Notable people 
 Rose Ferraby, artist and archaeologist.
Richard Aldborough, politician from the 1600s.

See also
 Aldborough (UK Parliament constituency)

References

External links

 Aldborough Roman Site: English Heritage

Villages in North Yorkshire
Boroughbridge
Former civil parishes in North Yorkshire